is a passenger train station in the city of Chikusei, Ibaraki, Japan, operated by the third sector railway company Mooka Railway.

Lines
Shimodate-Nikōmae Station is a station on the Mooka Line, and is located 2.2 rail kilometers from the terminus of the line at Shimodate Station.

Station layout
The station consists of a single side platform serving traffic in both directions. The station is unattended.

History
Shimodate-Nikōmae Station opened on 11 April 1988.

Passenger statistics
In fiscal 2018, the station was used by an average of 49 passengers daily (boarding passengers only).

Surrounding area

See also
 List of railway stations in Japan

References

External links

 Mooka Railway Station information 

Railway stations in Ibaraki Prefecture
Railway stations in Japan opened in 1988
Chikusei